The 2019 Conference USA men's basketball tournament was the concluding event of the 2018–19 Conference USA (C-USA) men's basketball season. It was held from March 13–16, 2019 alongside the C-USA women's tournament in Frisco, Texas, at the Ford Center at The Star. In the first round and quarterfinals, two games were played simultaneously within the same arena, with the courts separated by a curtain. Old Dominion defeated Western Kentucky 62–56 in the championship game to win the tournament, and received the conference's automatic bid to the 2019 NCAA tournament. It was their first Conference USA title since joining the conference six years ago.

Seeds
Only 12 conference teams play in the tournament. The top four teams receive a bye to the quarterfinals of the tournament. Teams are seeded within one of three groups. After each team had played 14 conference games, the teams were divided into groups based on conference record at that point in the season. The top five teams were placed in one group, the next five in a second group, and the bottom four in a final group. All teams were at that time locked into a seeding range that corresponded to their group—for example, the top five teams were assured the top five seeds. The remaining four conference games were played strictly within each group. The final seeding within each group is determined by overall conference record, with a tiebreaker system to seed teams with identical conference records. Only the top two teams within the bottom group enter the tournament.

Schedule

Rankings denote tournament seed.

Bracket

* denotes overtime period.

References

See also
 2019 Conference USA women's basketball tournament

2018–19 Conference USA men's basketball season
Conference USA men's basketball tournament
College sports tournaments in Texas
Sports in Frisco, Texas
Conference USA men's basketball tournament
Conference USA men's basketball tournament
Basketball competitions in Texas